Mandave is a small village in Ratnagiri district, Maharashtra state in Western India. The 2011 Census of India recorded a total of 855 residents in the village.
From this village one can visit all three forts located in Khed taluka; Sumargad, Mahipatgad, and Rasalgad.

See also
 Mandave Kd – a village in Parner taluka, Ahmednagar district, Maharashtra, India

References

Villages in Ratnagiri district